Presidential Palace is the official residence of the President of Moldova.

History 

The building was built between 1984 and 1987 by Yuri Tumanean, Arkady Zaltman, and Viktor Iavorski. The building was built on the site of the German Lutheran Church dating back to the 1830s. It was made to be the new building of the Supreme Soviet of the Moldavian SSR. The Moldovan Declaration of Independence of 27 August 1991 was signed and adopted in the palace by the Supreme Soviet. After Moldova gained its independence, the building became the residence of the president of Moldova starting in 2001 with President Vladimir Voronin. The building was devastated during protests on April 7, 2009 against President Voronin. As a result of the protest, the palace was closed off.

Renovations 
In the early years of the Dodon presidency, steps were taken to renovate the palace with the help of the Turkish government. The newly renovated palace was opened on October 17, 2018, in the presence of President Dodon and Turkish president Recep Tayyip Erdogan. The following January, Dodon invited ex-presidents Petru Lucinschi and Mircea Snegur on a tour of the newly renovated palace. In April 2019, Moldovan journalists were given a tour of the palace to allow the press to have an understanding of the renovations. On Independence Day in 2020, due to the COVID-19 pandemic in Moldova, a national ceremony closed to the public was held in the Historical Hall of the Presidential Palace.

Description
When describing the renovation, President Dodon joked: "There was nothing here when we arrived, but you know, I’m a man who treasures his household, so we brought a few things". Under his term, he kept created wine basement, an artificial lake, and a chicken farm. His presidency also included the introduction of a Ziua Ușilor Deschise (Open Doors Day) at the palace for Moldovan youth.

Gallery

See also 
Presidential palace
President of Moldova
Condrița
Parliament of the Republic of Moldova
Government House, Chișinău
Great National Assembly Square, Chișinău

References 

Presidential residences
Government buildings completed in 1984
Buildings and structures in Chișinău
Houses completed in 1984